Lieutenant-General Robert Clark Menzies CB OBE (born 1944) is a retired British Army medical officer and Surgeon General of the British Armed Forces between 2000 and 2002.

References

 

Living people
1944 births
Royal Army Medical Corps officers
British Army generals
Surgeons-General of the British Armed Forces
People educated at Kilmarnock Academy
Alumni of the University of Glasgow
Companions of the Order of the Bath
Officers of the Order of the British Empire